Osita M. Ogbu , OON is a professor of economics at the University of Nigeria. He was the Minister of National Planning from 2005 to 2006, and former Chief Economic Advisor to the President of Nigeria.

He is a former visiting fellow of the Brookings Institution's Africa Growth Initiative.

Early life and education
Osita Ogbu is from Ovoko, in Igbo-Eze South LGA of Enugu State in Nigeria. Ogbu was born on September 29, 1957, at Onitsha. He had his early education at the Holy Trinity Primary School, Onitsha and St. Teresa's College, Nsukka. He was educated at the University of Nigeria, Nsukka where he graduated in
1979 with a B.Sc. in economics and at Howard University in Washington D.C., US, where he
obtained an M.A. in economics in 1984 and a Ph.D. in economics in 1988. He also has a certificate in corporate governance from Harvard University (July 2009).https://www.unn.edu.ng/internals/staff/viewProfile/MjM1NA--

Career

Post-UNN
Osita Ogbu was a sales manager with the Lever Brothers (Nig.) Ltd from 1980 to 1983, managing, at
different times, the Delta District and Industrial Sales in Lagos. He was a Consultant Research Economist in
the Africa Region of the World Bank in Washington D.C between 1987 and 1991. He worked for
the International Development Research Centre of Canada in Ottawa and at the regional office in
Nairobi as a senior program specialist from 1991 to 2001.

ATPS
Osita Ogbu set up the African Technology Policy Studies Network (ATPS) as international organization in Nairobi and was the executive director/CEO of
the institution from 2001 to 2005. ATPS is an international policy research institution devoted to the promotion and application of science and technology for Africa's development.

Government
Osita Ogbu was the Chief Economic Adviser to the President of the Federal
Republic of Nigeria and Cabinet Minister responsible for National Planning Commission from 2005 to 2006. As the Chief Economic Adviser, Osita Ogbu was the Deputy Leader of the National Economic Team. He was a former Chairman of the Governing Council of the Nigerian Institute of Social and
Economic Research, Ibadan.

Current
He is currently a professor of Economics and Director of the Institute for Development Studies at the University of Nigeria, Nsukka. He is also the MD/CEO of the African Development Solutions International Ltd. [ADSI], a knowledge-based consulting firm, in Abuja, Nigeria.

He is a current Trustee of The Clement Isong Foundation and a Director of the AfriHeritage Institution, Enugu. He serves on the Economic Advisory Committee and the Privatization Council of Enugu State.

Books

Creative writing
Novel: The Moon Also Sets [published by the East African Educational Publishers, Kenya Ltd, Nairobi (2002)
and Heinemann Nigeria Ltd, Ibadan (2003)].

Edited
1. Eboh, E. & Ogbu, O. (2010). The Global Economic Crisis and Nigeria: Taking the
Right Lessons, Avoiding the Wrong Lessons, (African Institute for Applied Economics,
Enugu, Nigeria: 2010).

2. Charles Soludo, Osita Ogbu, and Ha-Joon Chang (2004). The Politics of Trade and Industrial
Policy in Africa (Africa World Press Inc., New Jersey, US: 2004).

3. Ogbu, O., Oyeyinka, B. and Mlawa, H. (1995). Technology Policy and Practice in Africa,
(IDRC Books, Canada: 1995).

4. Uramah, C.K; Ogbu, Osita; Bijker, W; Alfonso, A.; Gomez, N.; Ozor, N.(2009). The African Manifesto
for Science, Technology and Innovation.( African Technology Policy Studies Network,
Kenya, Nairobi: 2009).

Personal life

Bibliography

Academic papers 
 
 
 
 <

Novels 
 The Moon Also Sets (2005)

References

Year of birth missing (living people)
Living people
Nigerian economists
Nigerian politicians
Igbo academics